De Maria is a surname. Notable people with the surname include:

Ercole de Maria (died c. 1640), Italian Baroque painter
Isidoro de María (1815–1906), Uruguayan writer, historian, journalist, politician and diplomat
De María (footballer) (1896-unknown), João de María, Brazilian footballer
Luca De Maria (born 1989), Italian rower
Mauricio de Maria y Campos (born 1943), Mexican diplomat
Walter De Maria (1935–2013), American artist, sculptor, illustrator and composer